Aircraft Inspection, Repair & Overhaul Depot Sdn Bhd or AIROD is a Malaysian aerospace company engaged in providing aircraft maintenance, repair and overhaul (MRO) services. The name AIROD is an acronym that stands for Aircraft Inspection, Repair & Overhaul Depot.

History

It was established in 1975 as the only in-country facility to support the Royal Malaysian Air Force (RMAF) aircraft. In 1985, AIROD was privatised as a joint-venture company between Malaysia's National Aerospace & Defence Industries Bhd (NADI) and Lockheed Aircraft Systems International (LASI) of the US.

Today, AIROD is a fully Malaysian-owned company under the NADI group of companies and is a leading MRO facility providing services to regional and global customers in the Southeast Asian region.

AIROD's multimillion-dollar MRO facility is located at the Sultan Abdul Aziz Shah (SAAS) Airport Complex at Subang, northwest of Kuala Lumpur, Malaysia's capital city, where it occupies a  site on the northeastern side of the runway. The facility includes both narrow- and wide-body aircraft hangars, a paint and strip hangar, support shops, and engine test cells. In January 2005, a partnership agreement was established between AIROD Malaysia and AAR Corporation to establish a regional MRO centre for landing gears in Subang.

Facilities and capabilities 
Source:

Aircraft MRO, modification and upgrades
C-130 fuselage stretch
C-130 tanker conversion
Mi-171 airborne fire fighting system
Scheduled maintenance
Avionics modernization / upgrade
Service life extension
Rewiring
NVIS modification
System integration
Structural modification
Ageing aircraft program
Interior refurbishment & conversion
Corrosion control / repair
Crash damage repair

Engine maintenance repair and overhaul

Rolls-Royce T56/501
General Electric CT58/T58
Pratt & Whitney PT6

Aero & avionics components maintenance, repair & overhaul

Mechanical components
Propellers
Wheels, tires & brakes
Gear boxes
Rotor heads
Landing gears
Hydraulic servos & actuators
Drive shafts
Fuel control units
Rotor balancing
Fuel / oil pumps
Fuel governors
Fuel nozzles
Fuel flow dividers

Avionics components
Flight instruments
Electrical components
Communications & navigation equipment
Wire harness fabrication
Electronics & precision measurement 
PME calibration
Aircraft batteries’ servicing

Aircraft

Fixed wing

Boeing 727-200 / 737-200 / 737-900 (BBJ)
Bombardier Regionel Jet / Global Express
Dassault Falcon F900
Lockheed Martin C-130 / L-100 / KC-130-J
CN-235
Fokker F-28
Pilatus PC-7
Pilatus PC-7 Mk II
Beechcraft King Air B200T
Northrop F-5
BAE Hawk 108 / 208
Alenia Aermacchi MB339AM/CM

Rotary wing
Sikorsky S61A / S70A
Agusta Westland Super Lynx Mk300
Agusta A109 LOH / LUH
Agusta Westland A109P/E
Agusta Westland AW139
Mil Mi-17 / 171
Aerospatiale Alouette IIIB

Customer

Military
Bangladesh Air Force (BAF)
Botswana Defense Forces (BDF)
Ecuador Air Force (FAE)
Indonesian Air Force (TNI-AU)
Kuwait Air Force (KAF)
Libyan Air Force (LAF)
Malaysian Army Aviation (MAA)
Pakistan Air Force (PAF)
Philippine Air Force (PAF)
Royal Malaysian Air Force (RMAF)
Royal Malaysian Navy (RMN)
Royal Malaysian Police Air Unit (RMPAU)
Royal Thai Air Force (RTAF)
Sri Lanka Air Force (SLAF)
United States Air Force (USAF)
United States Marine Corps (USMC)
Yemen Air Force (YAF)

Non-military
Air Niugini, Papua New Guinea
DERCO Aerospace Inc., USA
Department of Civil Aviation, Malaysia
Fire & Rescue Department (Bomba), Malaysia
SAFAIR, South Africa
Transafrik International, Uganda
Weststar Aviation, Malaysia
Aventura Aviation
Gading Sari
Mafira Air
Neptune Air
Pacific Air
Pegasus Air
Repex
Royal Air Cambodge
Sempati Air
Transmile  Air

References

External links
 AIROD

1975 establishments in Malaysia
Aircraft engineering companies
Aerospace companies of Malaysia
Defense companies of Malaysia
Privately held companies of Malaysia
Malaysian companies established in 1975
Manufacturing companies established in 1975